Kidō Senshi Gundam: Senshitachi no Kiseki (機動戦士ガンダム　戦士達の軌跡, Kidō Senshi Gandamu: Senshitachi no Kiseki, lit. "Mobile Suit Gundam: Pilot's Locus") is a GameCube-exclusive third-person shooter video game released in 2004 by Bandai. The game was released only in Japan and a part of the Mobile Suit Gundam series.

2004 video games
GameCube-only games
Third-person shooters
Bandai games
Japan-exclusive video games
Gundam video games
GameCube games
Video games developed in Japan
Single-player video games